The following is a list of the largest cities/towns of Madeira. Funchal is the only city with a population over 100,000.

Madeira Island
Calheta
Câmara de Lobos
Funchal
Machico
Ponta do Sol
Porto Moniz
Ribeira Brava
Santa Cruz
Santana
São Vicente

Porto Santo Island
Porto Santo

Madeira
Cities
Populated places in Madeira
cities Madeira